The West Indies cricket team toured England in the summer of 2012. The tour comprised three Test matches, three One Day Internationals and one Twenty20 International. One Test was originally awarded to Cardiff, but this was later awarded to Lord's after Glamorgan County Cricket Club were unable to pay their fee for hosting the 2011 Sri Lanka Test in time.



Squads

† Tino Best and Sunil Narine replaced the injured Shannon Gabriel and Kemar Roach for the second and third Test matches respectively.
* Chris Woakes was added to the squad as cover for Jade Dernbach, who was given leave from the second ODI on compassionate grounds, following the death of his Surrey team-mate Tom Maynard.
‡ Stuart Meaker and James Tredwell replaced Stuart Broad, Tim Bresnan and Graeme Swann for the third ODI.

Tour matches

First-class: Sussex v West Indians

First-class: England Lions v West Indians

Two-day: Leicestershire v West Indians

50-over: Middlesex Panthers v West Indians

Tests  (Wisden Trophy)

1st Test

2nd Test

3rd Test

ODI series

1st ODI

2nd ODI

3rd ODI

T20I

Only T20I

Statistics

England
Andrew Strauss scored his 20th Test century when he scored 122 in the 1st innings of the 1st Test.
Andrew Strauss scored his 21st Test century when he scored 141 in the 1st innings of the 2nd Test.
Stuart Broad took his 150th Test wicket in the 1st innings of the 1st Test.
Tim Bresnan took his 50th Test wicket in the 2nd innings of the 2nd Test.
Ian Bell scored his 2nd ODI century when he scored 126 in the 1st ODI.
Alastair Cook scored his 5th ODI century when he scored 112 in the 2nd ODI.

West Indies
Marlon Samuels reached 2,000 career Test runs when he scored 117 in the 1st innings of the 2nd Test.
Marlon Samuels scored his 3rd Test century when he scored 117 in the 1st innings of the 2nd Test.
Darren Sammy scored his 1st Test century when he scored 106 in the 1st innings of the 2nd Test.
Shannon Gabriel took his 1st Test wicket when he bowled Matt Prior in the 1st innings of the 1st Test.
Denesh Ramdin scored his 2nd Test century when he scored 107 not out in the 1st innings of the 3rd Test.
Tino Best set the record for the highest score by a number 11 batsman when he scored 95 in the 1st innings of the 3rd Test.

References

2012
International cricket competitions in 2012
West Indies